The Jessore–Jhenidah Light Railway was a   narrow gauge railway in British India, now in Bangladesh. It was constructed in 1913, and was dismantled in 1969. The railway developed a reputation for being poorly managed, an official report in 1915 states that staff could not nominate one person as their manager.

Stations 
Jessor Jn
Khairtola
Churamankati
Haibatpur
Muradgarh
Mithapukharia
Pirojpur
Dulalmundia
Shibnagore Junction
Prasannanagar
Bishaikhali
Jhenidah

Kotchandpur Branch (7.75 Mile) 
Shibnagore Junction
Gheeghati
Kotchandpur

Rolling stock 
In 1936, the company owned seven locomotives, one railcar, 31 coaches and 69 goods wagons.

Classification 
It was labeled as a Class III railway according to Indian Railway Classification System of 1926.

References 

2 ft 6 in gauge railways in Bangladesh